Klub Sportowy Świt Skolwin-Szczecin, commonly known as Świt Szczecin or Świt Skolwin, is a Polish football club, established in 1952, based in the Szczecin's neighbourhood of Skolwin. They compete in the III liga, group II.

Polish Cup records

References 

Sport in Szczecin
Association football clubs established in 1952
1952 establishments in Poland